Nancai Town is a town situated at the center of Shunyi District, Beijing. It is located south of Beixiaoying Town, west of Yang Town, North of Lisui and Renhe Towns, and east of Shuangfeng Subdistrict. It had 73,163 inhabitants within its borders in 2020.

The town's name came from Cai Village that used to exist in the area, which was later split into north and south villages during the Yuan dynasty.

History

Administrative divisions 
In 2021, There were 27 subdivisions within Nancai Town, consisted of 1 community and 26 villages:

See also 

 List of township-level divisions of Beijing

References 

Towns in Beijing
Shunyi District